The Zhangjiachuan Hui Autonomous County is a county in the east of Gansu Province of the People's Republic of China, bordering Shaanxi Province to the east. It is under the administration of the prefecture-level city of Tianshui. Its postal code is 741500, and in 1999 its population was 299,277 people.

Administrative divisions
Zhangjiachuan Hui Autonomous County is divided to 10 towns and 5 townships.
Towns

Townships

Climate

See also
 List of administrative divisions of Gansu

References

Zhangjiachuan Hui Autonomous County
Tianshui
Hui autonomous counties